The following is a list of Microsoft server technology.

Backup
 Data Protection Manager (Beta product)

Administration
 Terminal Services
 Active Directory (AD)
 Primary Domain Controller (PDC)
 Domain Controller
 Windows Server domain
 Windows Internet Naming Service (WINS)
 Remote Desktop Protocol (RDP) 
 Systems Management Server

Internet services
 Active Server Pages (ASP)
 Application Center Test (ACT)
 ASP.NET
 Internet Information Services (IIS)
 Microsoft Exchange Server
 Microsoft Forefront Threat Management Gateway (Forefront TMG)
 Microsoft Project Server
 Office Web Apps Server
 SharePoint
 Skype for Business Server

Databases
 Microsoft SQL Server
 Microsoft Desktop Engine

Developer Services
 Team Foundation Server
 Visual Studio Team Services

Virtualization
 Hyper-V

See also
 List of Microsoft topics

Server